Paremhat 29 - Coptic Calendar - Parmouti 1

The thirtieth day of the Coptic month of Paremhat, the seventh month of the Coptic year. In common years, this day corresponds to March 26, of the Julian Calendar, and April 8, of the Gregorian Calendar. This day falls in the Coptic Season of Shemu, the season of the Harvest.

Commemorations

Heavenly Orders 

 The commemoration of the Archangel Gabriel the Announcer

Judges 

 The departure of Samson, one of the Judges of Israel

Other commemorations 

 The relocation of the Relics of Saint James the Persian, known as Intercisus

References 

Days of the Coptic calendar